Events from the year 1857 in the United Kingdom.

Incumbents
 Monarch – Victoria
 Prime Minister – Henry John Temple, 3rd Viscount Palmerston (Whig)
 Parliament – 16th (until 21 March), 17th (starting 30 April)

Events
 7 January – London General Omnibus Company begins operating.
 19 February – Lundhill Colliery explosion at Wombwell in the South Yorkshire Coalfield kills 189 miners.
 3 March – France and the United Kingdom formally declare war on China in the Second Opium War.
 5 March – in London, barrister James Townsend Saward receives a sentence of penal transportation for forging cheques.
 27 March–24 April – a general election secures Palmerston's Whigs a clear majority.
 4 April – end of the Anglo-Persian War.
 5 May–17 October – the Art Treasures of Great Britain exhibition is held in Manchester, one of the largest such displays of all time.
 10 May – Indian Rebellion: In India, the Mutiny of XI Native Cavalry of the Bengal Army in Meerut, revolt against the British East India Company.
 11 May – Indian combatants capture Delhi from the East India Company.
 18 May – British Museum Reading Room opens.
 22 June – the South Kensington Museum, predecessor of the Victoria and Albert Museum, is opened by Queen Victoria in London; it is the world’s first museum to incorporate a refreshment room.
 25 June – Queen Victoria formally grants her husband Albert the title Prince Consort.
 26 June – at a ceremony in Hyde Park, London, Queen Victoria awards the first sixty-six Victoria Crosses, for actions during the Crimean War. Commander Henry James Raby, RN, is the first to receive the medal from her hands.
 12 July – in Belfast, confrontations between crowds of Catholics and Protestants turn into 10 days of rioting, exacerbated by the open-air preaching of Evangelical Presbyterian minister "Roaring" Hugh Hanna, with many of the police force joining the Protestant side. There are also riots in Derry, Portadown and Lurgan.
 18 July – prison hulk HMS Defence catches fire at her moorings off Woolwich, bringing an end to the use of hulks in home waters.
 28 August – Matrimonial Causes Act removes divorce from ecclesiastical jurisdiction and makes it possible by order of a new civil Court for Divorce and Matrimonial Causes, removing the necessity of parliamentary approval.
 September – Obscene Publications Act makes the sale of obscene material a statutory offence.
 20 September – British forces recapture Delhi, compelling the surrender of Bahadur Shah II, the last Mughal emperor.
 24 October – Sheffield F.C., the world's first football team, is founded in Sheffield.
 November – Kilburn White Horse cut in North Yorkshire.
 29 November – Orsini affair: Piedmontese revolutionary Felice Orsini leaves exile in London to make an assassination attempt on Emperor Napoleon III of France in Paris.
 31 December – Queen Victoria chooses Ottawa as the capital of Canada.

Undated
 First official issue of uniforms of the Royal Navy to naval ratings.
 Tom Gallaher sets up the Gallaher tobacco business in Ireland.

Publications
 R. M. Ballantyne's novel The Coral Island.
 George Borrow's novel The Romany Rye.
 Charlotte Brontë's novel The Professor (posthumously, as by 'Currer Bell').
 Charles Dickens's novel Little Dorrit (complete in book form).
 Elizabeth Gaskell's biography The Life of Charlotte Brontë.
 P. H. Gosse's creationist text Omphalos.
 Thomas Hughes' novel Tom Brown's Schooldays.
 George A. Lawrence's novel Guy Livingstone, or Thorough (anonymously).
 John Ruskin's introductory text The Elements of Drawing.
 William Makepeace Thackeray's historical novel The Virginians (begins serialisation).
 Anthony Trollope's novel Barchester Towers.

Births 
 18 January – William Lethaby, Arts and Crafts architect and designer (died 1931)
 25 January – Hugh Lowther, 5th Earl of Lonsdale, sportsman (died 1944)
 31 January – George Jackson Churchward, chief mechanical engineer of the Great Western Railway (died 1933)
 2 February – Sir James Cory, 1st Baronet, politician and ship-owner (died 1933)
 22 February – Robert Baden-Powell, founder of the Scouting movement (died 1941)
 13 March – Herbert Plumer, 1st Viscount Plumer, general (died 1932)
 14 March – Ishbel Hamilton-Gordon, Marchioness of Aberdeen and Temair, patron and promoter of women's interests (died 1939)
 27 March – Karl Pearson, statistician (died 1936)
 8 April – Lucy, Lady Houston, born Fanny Lucy Radmall, political activist, suffragette, philanthropist and promoter of aviation (died 1936)
 11 April – John Davidson, Scottish-born poet and playwright (suicide 1909)
 14 April
 Princess Beatrice of the United Kingdom, member of the royal family (died 1944)
 Victor Horsley, physician, surgeon (died 1916) 
 13 May – Ronald Ross, physician, recipient of the Nobel Prize in Physiology or Medicine (died 1932)
 15 May – Williamina Fleming, astronomer (died 1911)
 28 May – Charles Voysey, Arts and Crafts designer and domestic architect (died 1941)
 2 June – Edward Elgar, composer (died 1934)
 12 June – Kate Lester, stage and silent screen actress (died 1924)
 15 June – William Fife, Scottish yacht designer (died 1944)
 28 June – Robert Jones, Welsh orthopaedic surgeon (died 1933)
 19 September – James Bridie, rugby union international (died 1893)
 28 September – Lewis Bayly, admiral (died 1938)
 2 October
 John Macintyre Scottish laryngologist and pioneer radiographer (died 1928)
 A. E. Waite, occultist (died 1942)
 4 October – Will Thorne, trade unionist (died 1946)
 5 November – Joseph Tabrar, songwriter (died 1931)
 17 November – George Marchant, inventor, manufacturer and philanthropist (died 1941)
 22 November – George Gissing, novelist (died 1903)
 27 November – Charles Scott Sherrington, physiologist, Nobel Prize laureate (died 1952)
 30 November – Bobby Abel, cricketer (died 1936)
 2 December  – Robert Armstrong-Jones, physician and psychiatrist (died 1943)

Deaths
 1 January – John Britton, antiquary and topographer (born 1771)
 2 January – Andrew Ure, doctor and writer (born 1778)
 20 January – John Manners, 5th Duke of Rutland (born 1778)
 10 February – David Thompson, explorer (born 1770)
 18 February – Francis Egerton, 1st Earl of Ellesmere, politician (born 1800)
 22 February – Henry Lascelles, 3rd Earl of Harewood, peer and Member of Parliament (born 1797)
 13 March – William Amherst, 1st Earl Amherst, diplomat and peer (born 1773)
 11 May – Granville Waldegrave, 2nd Baron Radstock, naval officer (born 1786)
 16 May – Sir William Lloyd, soldier and mountaineer (born 1782)
 27 May – George Anson, army officer and Whig politician (born 1797)
 12 August – William Conybeare, dean of Llandaff (born 1787)
 16 August – John Jones, Talysarn, leading non-conformist minister (born 1796)
 24 November – Sir Henry Havelock, general (born 1795)
 30 November – Mary Buckland, palaeontologist and marine biologist (born 1797)
 15 December – Sir George Cayley, aviation pioneer (born 1773)
 17 December – Sir Francis Beaufort, naval officer and hydrographer (born 1774)

See also
 1857 in Scotland

References

 
Years of the 19th century in the United Kingdom